The Folks Nation is an alliance of street gangs originating in Chicago, established in 1978.  The alliance has since spread throughout the United States, particularly the Midwest region of the United States. They are rivals of the People Nation.

Formation
The Folks Nation was formed on November 11, 1978, within the confines of the Stateville Correctional Center. Larry Hoover, the chairman of the Gangster Disciple Nation, created the idea for the alliance and persuaded many leaders of large black, white, and Latino gangs from Chicago to join. Soon after its formation, the People Nation was formed to counter the Folks alliance.

Symbols 
Folks Nation symbols include the Star of David, horns, a die with 6 dots facing forward, the digit 6, a devil's tail, a pitchfork, a heart with horns, a heart with wings, the digit 3, three dots, a symbol called Third World or Saturn (digit 3 within a circle with a horizontal curved line through it), the digit 2 (used by the Insane Deuce Nation), the digit 4 (used by Insane Two-Two Nation and the Almighty Harrison Gent Nation), the digit 7 (used by the Almighty Imperial Gangster Nation), the digit 8 (used by the Insane Ashland Viking Nation), the number 13 (used by the Milwaukee King Nation), the Playboy bunny (used by all Gangster Familia nations excluding the Gangster Disciple Nation), a cane (used by the Almighty Stoned Freak Nation, Almighty Vice Lord Nation, Almighty Harrison Gent Nation and the Latin Jiver Nation), a top hat (used by the Almighty Harrison Gent Nation and the Latin Jiver Nation), a crown with seven rounded steps (used by Almighty Imperial Gangster Nation, sometimes the Gangster Disciple Nation), a six point crown (represents entire Folks Nation though modern use is typically by the Insane Gangster Satan Disciple Nation), various cross variants, and the number 360, "360°" or phrase "360 degrees", usually used to refer to their international presence (360 degrees around the globe) though it has other meanings within Folks literature.

Folks gangs also disrespect People Nation gangs by inverting or "cracking" (adding crack marks to or removing half of a gang symbol) their symbols.

Active Gangs

A 1995 report from the Florida Department of Corrections' Security Threat Intelligence Unit listed Folk Nation's major sets as follows:
 Latin Eagles
 Simon City Royals
 Gangster Disciples
 Spanish Cobras
 Maniac Latin Disciples
 Black Disciples
 La Raza Nation
 Spanish Gangster Disciples
 Tall Arabian Posse Boys

References

 
Organizations established in 1978
1978 establishments in Illinois
Street gangs
Gangs in Chicago
Coalitions